Sweet Savage is a 1979 American pornographic film written and directed by Ann Perry and starring porn performers Carol Connors and Jack Birch along with straight acting veteran Aldo Ray, a Golden Globe nominee, in a non-sex role. Along with Russ Meyer's nudie-cutie Wild Gals of the Naked West (1962) and the hardcore A Dirty Western (1975), it is one of the few pornographic films in the American Western movie genre.

Cast
 Carol Connors as Miss Lilly
 Aldo Ray as Banner
 Beth Anna as Shy Dove
 John Hollabaugh as Damon
 Jack Birch as Mr. Bret
 Eileen Welles as Jamie

Release
The film was released in California and Houston, Texas, in June 1979. A 'cool' version with the explicit sex scenes removed was also released in certain theatres. The 'cool' version was due for release in Redding, California, but the print was confiscated by authorities, the city's first attempt to prevent the showing of an allegedly obscene film. The film opened in New York in July 1979.

Awards 
in 1980, Ray was awarded Best Actor from the Adult Film Association's third Erotica Awards.

References

External links
 

1979 films
American pornographic films
American Western (genre) films
1979 Western (genre) films
1970s pornographic films
1970s English-language films
1970s American films